Marquess of San Damián is a hereditary title in the Peerage of Spain, granted in 1606 by Philip III to Alonso de Idiázquez, viceroy of Navarre and knight of the Order of Santiago. It was bestowed along with the titles of Duke of Ciudad Real and Count of Aramayona.

Marquesses of San Damián (1606)

Alonso de Idiázquez y Butrón-Múgica, 1st Marquess of San Damián (1564-1618)
Juan Alonso de Idiázquez y Robles, 2nd Marquess of San Damián (1597-1653), son of the 1st Marquess
Francisco Alonso de Idiázquex y Álava, 3rd Marquess of San Damián (b. 1620), son of the 2nd Marquess
Francisco de Idiázquez y Borja Aragón, 4th Marquess of San Damián (b. 1676), son of the 3rd Marquess
Juana María de Idiázquez y Borja Aragón, 5th Marchioness of San Damián (d. 1712), sister of the 4th Marquess
María Antonia Pimentel e Idiázquez, 6th Marchioness of San Damián (1686-1728), daughter of the 5th Marchioness
Ana María de Orozco y Villela, 7th Marchioness of San Damián (b. 1711), great-granddaughter of the 3rd Marquess
Joaquín Antonio Osorio y Orozco, 8th Marquess of San Damián (1734-1782), son of the 7th Marchioness
Benito Osorio y Lasso de la Vega, 9th Marquess of San Damián (d. 1819), son of the 8th Marquess

Marquesses of San Damián (1918)

Carlos de Figueroa y Alonso-Martínez, 10th Marquess of San Damián (1895-1971), direct descendant of the 7th Marchioness
Carlos de Figueroa y Castillejo, 11th Marquess of San Damián (1931-2012), son of the 10th Marquess
Elena Carlota de Figueroa y Sartorius, 12th Marchioness of San Damián (b. ?), daughter of the 11th Marquess

See also
Marquess of Villabrágima
Count of Yebes
Count of Velayos

References

Marquesses of Spain
Lists of Spanish nobility
Noble titles created in 1606